The Sedetani were an ancient Iberian (Pre-Roman) people of the Iberian peninsula (the Roman Hispania). They are believed to have spoken a form of the Iberian language.

The Sedetani minted their own coins. Their territory extended from central to southern present-day Aragon, bordering with the land of the Ilercavones in the east and the Edetani in the south. Some of their main towns were Salduie, Salduba in ancient Roman sources, located in present-day Zaragoza, and the Cabezo de Alcalá near Azaila.

Silius Italicus describes a Sedetani contingent in Hannibal's army, being led by two chieftains named Mandonius and Caeso.

See also
Iberians
Pre-Roman peoples of the Iberian Peninsula

References

External links

Detailed map of the Pre-Roman Peoples of Iberia (around 200 BC)

Pre-Roman peoples of the Iberian Peninsula
Ancient peoples of Spain
Aragon